Tim Henman defeated Andrei Pavel in the final, 6–2, 7–6(8–6), 7–6(7–2) to win the singles tennis title at the 2003 Paris Masters.

Marat Safin was the reigning champion, but did not compete that year.

Seeds
A champion seed is indicated in bold text while text in italics indicates the round in which that seed was eliminated. All sixteen seeds received a bye into the second round.

Draw

Finals

Top half

Section 1

Section 2

Bottom half

Section 3

Section 4

References
 2003 BNP Paribas Masters Draw

2003 BNP Paribas Masters
Singles